The 2018–19 ISU Junior Grand Prix was the 22nd season of a series of junior international competitions organized by the International Skating Union. It was the junior-level complement to the 2018–19 ISU Grand Prix of Figure Skating. Skaters competed for medals in the disciplines of men's singles, ladies' singles, pair skating, and ice dance, as well as for qualifying points. The top six from each discipline met at the 2018–19 Junior Grand Prix Final, which was held together with the senior final.

Competitions
The locations of the JGP events change yearly. In the 2018–19 season, the series was composed of the following events in autumn 2018:

Entries
Skaters who reached the age of 13 by July 1, 2018 but had not turned 19 (singles and females of the other two disciplines) or 21 (male pair skaters and ice dancers) were eligible to compete on the junior circuit. Competitors were chosen by their countries according to their federation's selection procedures. The number of entries allotted to each ISU member federation was determined by their skaters' placements at the 2018 World Junior Championships in each discipline.

Medalists

Men

Ladies

Pairs

Ice dance

Medal standings

JGP Final qualification standings

Qualification rules
At each event, skaters earn points toward qualification for the Junior Grand Prix Final. Following the 7th event, the top six highest scoring skaters advance to the Final. The points earned per placement are as follows:

There are seven tie-breakers in cases of a tie in overall points:
	Highest placement at an event. If a skater placed 1st and 3rd, the tiebreaker is the 1st place, and that beats a skater who placed 2nd in both events.
	Highest combined total scores in both events. If a skater earned 200 points at one event and 250 at a second, that skater would win in the second tie-break over a skater who earned 200 points at one event and 150 at another.
	Participated in two events.
	Highest combined scores in the free skating/free dance portion of both events.
	Highest individual score in the free skating/free dance portion from one event.
	Highest combined scores in the short program/short dance of both events.
	Highest number of total participants at the events.

If there is still a tie, it is considered unbreakable and the tied skaters all advance to the Junior Grand Prix Final.

Qualification standings 
Bold denotes Junior Grand Prix Final qualification.

Qualifiers

Top JGP scores

Men

Best total score

Best short program score

Best free skating score

Ladies

Best total score

Best short program score

Best free skating score

Pairs

Best total score

Best short program score

Best free skating score

Ice dance

Best total score

Best rhythm dance score

Best free dance score

References

External links
 ISU Junior Grand Prix at the International Skating Union

ISU Junior Grand Prix
Junior Grand Prix
Figure skating